DCC plc is a leading Irish international sales, marketing and support services group operating in 22 countries. Headquartered in Dublin, the Group operates across three sectors: energy, healthcare and technology, employing over 16,000. DCC plc is listed on the London Stock Exchange and is a constituent of the FTSE 100 Index.

History
The company was founded by Jim Flavin in 1976 as Development Capital Corporation Limited. Originally the company focused on providing venture capital to start ups, however in the mid-1980s it changed direction and became an industrial holding company, changing its name to DCC and floating on the Irish Stock Exchange and London Stock Exchange in 1994.

The company was embroiled in a controversy over the issue of insider trading in Fyffes plc, the Irish fruit importing company in which a subsidiary of DCC, Lotus Green, held a stake which was sold in the year 2000. In 2002 Fyffes sued DCC over the sale of its stake in the company. The case was tried in the Irish High Court from December 2004 until July 2005, and on 21 December 2005 judgement was handed down. DCC was cleared of insider trading, although it was found to have been acting as a "single entity" with Lotus Green and Jim Flavin with regards to the sale of the shares. Fyffes appealed to the Supreme Court of Ireland and, in a judgement on 27 July 2007, the Supreme Court overturned the High Court's verdict and ruled that the documents that had been in Flavin's possession when DCC sold the shares had indeed been price sensitive. In April 2008, Fyffes settled its case against DCC for an amount of €37.6 million. As a result of this case, DCC and Flavin came under the examination of the Irish Director of Corporate Enforcement. In January 2010, The report of the High Court Inspector into the affairs of DCC plc was published. The Director of Corporate Enforcement concluded that no further action was warranted by his Office.

In 2011, DCC bought Maxol's Home Heating company, Maxol Direct, which it re-branded as Emo. In 2012, DCC spent around €100 million acquiring LPG (Liquefied Petroleum Gas) distribution businesses in the Netherlands, Britain, Sweden and Norway.

In August 2014, DCC announced that it reached an agreement with ExxonMobil to acquire the Esso Express petrol station network and the Esso Motorway concessions in France.

The company joined the FTSE 100 share index of the 100 companies listed on the London Stock Exchange with the highest market capitalisation in December 2015.

In February 2015, DCC completed the disposal of substantially all its Food & Beverage subsidiaries. During the same year the company acquired Butagaz S.A.S., a French LPG business, from Shell for €464 million. The acquisition made DCC Europe's third-largest LPG distributor.

In March 2016, the company agreed to acquire Alimentation Couche Tard's commercial and aviation fuels business in Denmark for €40 million. The deal included a 139-site retail petrol station network and supply contracts with 66 dealers.

In April 2017, DCC announced it had agreed to sell its Environmental division to Exponent, a private equity firm, for £219 million. The company also announced the acquisition of Shell's liquefied petroleum gas business in Hong Kong and Macau for £120 million, its first acquisition outside of Europe, and the retirement of its chief executive Tommy Breen.

In July 2017 Donal Murphy, previously Managing Director of DCC Energy, became Chief Executive.

In 2019 DCC purchased the retail fuel operations of Tesco Ireland, with these being converted to automated stations under "Certa" branding. This branding is a variant of the "Certas" name which is used for home heating oil in the UK and as the holding company for their Esso branded stations in Europe.

Divisions
These are:
DCC Energy, a liquefied petroleum gas sales and marketing business in Europe, with a developing business in the retailing of natural gas
DCC Healthcare, a healthcare business, providing products and services to healthcare providers and health and beauty brand owners
DCC Technology, a route-to-market and supply chain partner for global technology brands

See also
 List of Irish companies

References

External links
Official Website

Companies formerly listed on Euronext Dublin
Holding companies of Ireland
Holding companies established in 1976
Companies listed on the London Stock Exchange
Irish companies established in 1976